Bristol South is a constituency represented in the House of Commons of the UK Parliament since 2015 by Karin Smyth of the Labour Party.

Constituency profile
Bristol South is a traditional white working class seat. Residents' wealth is around average for the UK.

Boundaries 

1885–1918: The Borough of Bristol wards of Bedminster East, Bedminster West, Bristol, and Redcliffe, and part of the civil parish of Bedminster.

1918–1950:  The County Borough of Bristol wards of Bedminster East, Bedminster West, and Southville, and part of Somerset ward.

1950–1955: The County Borough of Bristol wards of Bedminster, Somerset, Southville, and Windmill Hill.

1955–1983:  The County Borough of Bristol wards of Bedminster, Bishopsworth, Hengrove, Somerset, and Southville.

1983–1997:  The City of Bristol wards of Bedminster, Bishopsworth, Filwood, Hartcliffe, Knowle, Southville, Whitchurch Park, and Windmill Hill.

1997–present:  The City of Bristol wards of Bedminster, Bishopsworth, Filwood, Hartcliffe, Hengrove, Knowle, Southville, Whitchurch Park, and Windmill Hill.

The constituency covers the south-west of Bristol, bounded by the Avon New Cut to the north, the A37 Wells Road to the east, and the city boundaries to the south and west.

History 
The seat has elected Labour MPs at every election since 1935, the only seat in the south of England outside Greater London with such a record.  The closest result, giving a marginal majority, was the 1987 election where Dawn Primarolo won a majority of 2.7% of the vote — in that election the Social Democratic Party, a 'moderate' breakaway party from the Labour Party, won 19.6% of the vote.

The incumbent prior to Smyth was Baroness Dawn Primarolo who held the seat for 28 years.  She was a Minister of the Crown in the Blair Ministry and throughout the Coalition Government 2010 was a Deputy Speaker of the House of Commons.

Members of Parliament

Elections

Elections in the 2010s

Elections in the 2000s

Elections in the 1990s

Elections in the 1980s

Elections in the 1970s

Elections in the 1960s

Elections in the 1950s

Elections in the 1940s

Elections in the 1930s

Elections in the 1920s

Elections in the 1910s

Elections in the 1900s

Elections in the 1890s

Elections in the 1880s

See also 
List of parliamentary constituencies in Avon

Notes

References

External links 
nomis Constituency Profile for Bristol South — presenting data from the ONS annual population survey and other official statistics.

Constituencies of the Parliament of the United Kingdom established in 1885
South